Darling, Count the Cash is a 1926 German silent comedy film directed by Felix Basch and starring Sig Arno, Ossi Oswalda, and Lydia Potechina.

The film's sets were designed by the art director Robert Neppach.

Cast
Sig Arno as Cäsar Glück
Ossi Oswalda as Ossi
Lydia Potechina as Ossis Mutter
Hans Albers as Theophil, der Geschäftsführer
Gyula Szőreghy as Faktotum
Karl Harbacher as Diener
Gerhard Ritterband as Lehrling
Paul Morgan as Konfektionsreisender
Rosa Valetti as Heiratsvermittlerin
 as Tanzlehrer
Hermann Picha as Kellner
Lissy Arna as Boxerbraut

Erich Brandl
Henry Bender

References

External links

1926 comedy films
German comedy films
Films of the Weimar Republic
German silent feature films
Films directed by Felix Basch
German black-and-white films
Silent comedy films
1920s German films